A Man About the House is a 1947 film directed by Leslie Arliss, based on the novel by Francis Brett Young.

A Man About the House may refer to:

 A Man About the House (novel), 1942 novel by Francis Brett Young
 A Man About the House (play), play by John Perry based on the novel
 "A Man About the House", 1972 episode of Both Ends Meet
 "A Man About the House", a 1977 episode of Three's Company

See also
 Man About the House, a British sitcom 1973 to 1976
 Man About the House (film), 1974 spin-off from the British situation comedy of the same name
 Man of the House (disambiguation)
 A Man in the House, a 1940 film